Fort Albany First Nation ("lagoon Cree") is a Cree First Nation in Cochrane District in Northeastern Ontario, Canada, within the territory covered by Treaty 9. Situated on the southern shore of the Albany River, Fort Albany First Nation is accessible only by air, water, or by winter road.

The community is policed by the Nishnawbe-Aski Police Service, an Aboriginal-based service. It shares the Fort Albany 67 Indian Reserve with the Kashechewan First Nation, which officially separated from Fort Albany First Nation in 1977. Fort Albany First Nation controls the Fort Albany Indian Settlement on the south shore of the Albany River, and the Kashechewan First Nation controls the Kashechewan Indian Settlement directly across the river.

Fort Albany was established in 1679 as one of the oldest and most important of Hudson's Bay Company posts. It was also involved in Anglo-French tensions leading to the Battle of Fort Albany in 1688. The current community is not the site of the old post, which was re-located several times including on Anderson Island, Albany Island 
(c.1721) and a location just northeast of the current community. The last trading post was closed up around the 1950s. All the post sites have disappeared and naturalized, leaving no trace of their former use.

History

Hudson's Bay Company Post 
The area was explored by Charles Bayly, the first overseas governor of the Hudson's Bay Company, around 1675, and the original Fort Albany was established in 1679. It was one of the original Hudson's Bay Company trading posts, the others being Moose Factory on the south shore of James Bay, Charles Fort (later Rupert House) on the east, York Factory in the Port Nelson region, and New Severn (aka Fort Severn). In these early days of the company, each fort was run by a governor, who served for a number of years and oversaw the company employees, managing the trade of their fort.

The original fort was built inland from the mouth of the Albany River, partly for defense, and moved several times. Ships from England had to lay at the river mouth at Albany Roads. In 1683, Governor Henry Sergeant was directed to make it the primary trading post of the Hudson's Bay Company; it was the largest fort on the Bay at that point, with four bastions and forty-three guns. In 1684 a Monsieur Péré reached the fort from French Canada. He was arrested and his two companions sent to Charlton Island. In 1685, the French built Fort des Français at the juncture of the Albany and Kenogami Rivers to block the indigenous people from coming north to trade with the HBC.

In 1686, all three posts on James Bay (Moose Factory, Rupert House, and Fort Albany) were captured by an overland expedition from Quebec. Fort Albany was named Fort Saint-Anne by the French. In 1688 the English sent ships to reestablish their posts but were defeated by French ships that had come to re-supply the forts. In 1693 the English retook the fort and held it thereafter. By the 1697 Treaty of Ryswick, Albany was to be returned to the French, but nothing was done until war resumed in 1702. In 1709 the French tried and failed to capture the fort. In 1713 the Treaty of Utrecht gave Hudson and James Bays (along with the rest of Rupert's Land) to the English.

Following the end of decades of conflict with the French, sloops from Albany traded along the east coast until a new post was built on the Eastmain River in 1723-24 and Moose Factory was reestablished in 1730. However, even by 1771, one ship serviced Albany, Moose Factory, and the East Main sub-house on the east shore.

Around the mid-1700s, the company's policy was to primarily engage in trade with indigenous people at their forts on the coast. By 1743, Chief Factor Joseph Isbister had found that trade at Albany was being undercut by coureurs des bois that had established trading posts upriver from the fort. So, going against company policy, he took a team 160 miles up river to establish the subsidiary Henley House and re-establish HBC authority. This policy officially changed in the 1770s, and the company began establishing series of inland posts that fed into the coastal forts and factories, which would function as depots for storage and ports for trade back to Europe. According to a report by long-time company factor Andrew Graham, by 1771, around the time of the change in policy, Fort Albany was staffed by 30 men in addition to the chief factor and his officers, and oversaw the sub-houses Henley House and East Main, each with eleven men governed by a sloop master.

Another official policy of the company was to not allow any of the indigenous people they traded with into any forts. This policy, relaxed by Chief Factor George Spence (1747-1752), was strictly enforced by Chief Factor Joseph Isbister when he returned to the fort in 1752. This sudden removal of access to Fort Albany and Henley House angered Wappisis, a Cree man influential over the indigenous people of the area, and in December 1754 he and a few others destroyed Henley House, killing the five HBC men there and raiding the stores, threatening death to anyone that told the Company people that they had done it. Wappisis went to Albany in May 1755 to trade and attempted to blame "French Indians" on the destruction of Henley House. Isbister heard in June from another indigenous person that Wappisis had done it, and Isbister hanged Wappisis and his two sons on June 21, 1755. The employees at Moose and Albany were concerned following the destruction of Henley House, since this was the first such incident of indigenous violence in the company's history. Henley House was re-established under Chief Factor Humphrey Marten by 1768.

In 1777, Gloucester House was built 243 miles upriver from Henley House and in 1786, Osnaburgh House was built at the outflow of Lake St. Joseph. This westward expansion significantly increased the trade of Fort Albany. In 1793, the Governor of Albany Fort established posts on the Rainy River and Winnipeg River. Posts supplied from the HBC-run Fort Albany competed with North West Company men from Lake Superior and even HBC posts supplied from York Factory, until the union of the two companies in 1821.

Fort Albany was the headquarters of the Albany District of the Hudson's Bay Company, which, as of 1830, bordered Severn District to its northwest, Moose District to its southeast, the far western reaches of Upper Canada to its south, Lac La Pluie District to its southwest, and Winnipeg District to its west. The east-flowing Albany River drew furs from as far west as Lake St. Joseph. From there a portage ran west to Lac Seul, the English River, the Winnipeg River and beyond. A north-flowing branch, the Kenogami River led upstream toward Lake Superior at Wawa, Ontario and another branch, the Ogoki River led toward Lake Nipigon.

Following the 1821 merger of HBC with the North West Company, Albany District thrived, recovering from the decline in trade caused by competition while the supply of fur-bearing animals dwindled. In order to curb the extinction of fur-bearing animals, the Governor of Rupert's Land George Simpson established beaver preserves throughout the district.

As of 1856, the Hudson's Bay Company estimated that there were 1,100 Indians living in the Albany District, which at the time included the trading posts of Fort Albany, Marten Falls, Osnaburg, and Lac Seul.

Surrender of Rupert's Land 

In 1868, the Hudson's Bay Company surrendered their North American territory known as Rupert's Land to Great Britain, which then gave it to the newly-formed Dominion of Canada with an 1869 "deed of surrender". Following this transfer to the Dominion, the province of Ontario engaged in litigation, arbitration, and negotiation to define its northern and western borders. In 1878, arbitrators granted Ontario territory north to the English and Albany rivers, causing Fort Albany to become part of the province. The Canada (Ontario Boundary) Act, 1889 officially expanded the province of Ontario north to Albany River and west to Lake of the Woods. At the suggestion of magistrate E. B. Borron, Ontario initially allowed the old HBC regime to manage the territory, until the province was able to more substantially take on its management, which began by appointing HBC officers as justices of the peace.

Moose Cree leaders, the Government of Ontario, and the Government of Canada signed The James Bay Treaty - Treaty No. 9 at Moose Factory on August 9, 1905.

In 1906, Fort Albany Residential School (also known as St. Anne's) opened at the Fort Albany Mission site on Albany Island, under the direction of the Oblates of Mary Immaculate and the Grey Nuns of the Cross as part of the Canadian Indian residential school system. According to the Indigenous Peoples Atlas of Canada, St. Anne's "was home to some of the most harrowing examples of abuse against Indigenous children in Canada." Students at the school came from First Nations around the James Bay region, including Fort Albany, Attawapiskat, Weenusk, Constance Lake, Moose Fort, and Fort Severn. The school was relocated to the north shore of the Albany River in 1932. It burned down in 1939 and was rebuilt.

The Government of Canada took over the management of the school at St. Anne's in 1965, and took over the residence in 1970. In 1976, the residence stopped operating, and the school was transferred to the Fort Albany band council.

Split with Kashechewan 
Old Fort Albany, which was on an island between the modern day communities of Fort Albany and Kashechewan First Nations, became separated into Anglican and Roman Catholic sections. Subsequently, the Roman Catholic mission and the Roman Catholic portion of the community moved to the current site of modern-day Fort Albany, on the southern shore of the river. The Anglican portion of the community some years later moved to the current site of Kashechewan, on the north shore. Up until the 1970s Fort Albany and Kashechewan shared the same chief and council. In the 1977 they came to have separate Band Councils. Fort Albany and Kashechewan are treated as separate bands, and function as separate bands today. New Fort Albany is mostly a Roman Catholic community, while Kashechewan is mainly Anglican.

Geography 
Fort Albany has a subarctic climate (Köppen Climate Classification Dfc) with mild summers and severely cold winters. There are very short transitional periods. Fort Albany's climate becomes colder after the bay freezes over. However, October temperatures are relatively mild, on average six degrees milder than April. The annual precipitation rate averages , which is noticeably higher in summer than at other times of the year.

Demographics

Language 
The majority of the population speaks Mushkegowuk Cree. Many men and women, younger and to the age of fifty, are bilingual in Cree and English. Children are taught in Cree and English at an early age. The community consists of quite a mixture of linguistics, with English, French, Cree, Ojibway, and Oji-Cree spoken.

Religion 
The two main forms of spirituality practised in Fort Albany are Christianity (Roman Catholicism) and Cree spirituality.

Economy 

The basic economy of the area is a subsistence allowance. There are seasonal jobs that involve construction work for the major capital projects like the dyke, the new school, and the Mid Canada Line. There are the traditional economic activities like trapping, fishing and hunting. There are a small number of employment opportunities including the Fort Albany First Nation Administration office, Mundo Peetabeck Education authority, Peetabeck Health Services. Fort Albany Power Authority, James Bay General Hospital, Northern Store, Air Creebec, and other small private owned businesses.

The new De Beers Diamond mine in James Bay may also provide many new opportunities.

Government 
Fort Albany First Nation is governed by a band council, consisting of a chief, deputy chief, and seven councillors, all of whom are elected by members of the community. Since 2022, the government has followed a custom election code, after having used the method laid out in the Indian Act since 1909. The current chiefs and councillors are:

 Chief Elizabeth Kataquapit
 Deputy Chief Terry Metatawabin
 First Councillor Brenda Scott
 Councillor Pascal Spence
 Councillor Joseph Scott
 Councillor Ruby Edward-Wheesk
 Councillor Madeline Scott
 Councillor Christopher Metatawabin
 Councillor Madeline Nakogee

Government history 

When it was a Hudson's Bay Company trading post, Fort Albany was overseen by a Chief Factor. Since 1909, an elected band government has been in charge of the reserve. Following the split with Kashechewan in 1977, each community has had its own band council. Fort Albany's electoral system followed the Indian Act until 2022, when a custom election code was put in place.

Military 
The Canadian Armed Forces have a presence in the First Nation through the Fort Albany Canadian Ranger Patrol, part of the 3rd Canadian Ranger Patrol Group. The Fort Albany Patrol launched in January 1995 with 20 Cree Rangers.

Infrastructure

Transportation 
The community of Fort Albany is accessible by air, water, and the winter road. The winter road is used only between January and March. Air Creebec provides Fort Albany with daily passenger flights, with connecting flights to Toronto, Montreal and/or other points of travel. These arrangements are done in Timmins on Air Creebec, Air Canada, Thunder Airlines, or Bearskin Airlines.

Fort Albany is also accessible via the waters of James Bay and the Albany River. Moosonee Transportation Limited provides barge service, carrying supplies at least once or twice each summer by traveling up and down the coast to each community. Freighter canoes can travel from Fort Albany to Calstock and return whenever the water levels are sufficient to make river travel possible.

During the summer months, people use outboard motors and canoes for other activities, such as hunting, trapping, and fishing. During the winter months, skidoos are the main transportation around the community. There are pick-up trucks, vans, and all-terrain vehicles owed by both businesses and individuals.

The winter road was completed in the early spring of 1974. It is also used extensively during the winter months. This road is maintained by contractors. The road links all the surrounding communities, such as Attawapiskat, Moosonee, Moose Factory, and Kashechewan. Feasibility studies have recently been undertaken on construction of a permanent all-season road to the communities. The project, if undertaken, will entail a "coastal road" connecting the four communities with each other, as well as a road to link the coastal road to the provincial highway system at Fraserdale, Kapuskasing or Hearst.

In January 2021, the 311-kilometre James Bay Winter Ice Road was under construction, to connect Attawapiskat, Kashechewan, Fort Albany and Moosonee. It opened some time in winter 2021 and was said to accept loads up to 50,000 kilograms in weight. The road is operated by Kimesskanemenow LP, "a limited partnership between the four communities it connects".

Aviation 
Air Creebec transports passengers and provides freight services through Fort Albany Airport. The present passenger rate is $921.90 for an adult return trip to Timmins. These rates increase on an annual basis. Seat sales are available, which are less expensive than the regular fare price. Air Creebec also provides charter flights when required.

Air Creebec also handles patient transportation up the coastal communities on a daily basis, Mondays to Fridays. These flights are intended only for hospital patients requiring out of the community hospital care. 
Other private small airlines, like Thunder Air and Wabusk Air, also provide charter services, which sometimes are cheaper than a regular flight on Air Creebec.

Healthcare 
Health care in Fort Albany is provided by a 17-bed Fort Albany Hospital staff 24/7 by nursing staff with consultation by doctors from Weeneebayko Area Health Authority as well as transfers to Timmins and Kingston.

Education 
The band runs Peetabeck Education, which administers Peetabeck Academy, a K–12 school that had its grand opening in 2015, at the same time the rectory of the old St. Anne's Indian Residential School burned.

References

External links
Official Website

Communities in Cochrane District
Nishnawbe Aski Nation
Hudson's Bay Company forts
Cree reserves in Ontario
1670 establishments in the British Empire
Albany
Road-inaccessible communities of Ontario
First Nations governments in Ontario